Mañjuśrīmitra (d. 740 CE) was an Indian Buddhist scholar. He became the main student of Garab Dorje and a teacher of Dzogchen.

Nomenclature and etymology
Mañjuśrī-mitra was his ordination-name—before ordination he was named "Siddhi-garbha" and "Samvara-garbha" His mother's name was Kuhanā.

Birth and early life
The exact location of Mañjuśrīmitra's birth is unknown. Mañjuśrīmitra, the son of an upper class Brahmin from a village to the west of Bodh Gaya, was initially schooled at home. Later he was a resident at Nalanda University where he became a respected Yogācāra scholar and practitioner.

Works
Many of Mañjuśrīmitra's works deal with a tantric text Mañjuśrīnāmasamgīti.

He was the person who divided the Dzogchen teachings into three series of Semde, Longdé and Manngagde.

In the Tibetan Buddhist Vajrayana tradition, Mañjuśrīmitra is held to have transmitted the Dzogchen teachings to Sri Singha. The "Six Meditation Experiences" (Tibetan: Gomnyam Drukpa) concealed in a jewelled casket was Mañjuśrīmitra's "quintessential testament" to Sri Singha, his principal disciple.

One of the main works of Mañjuśrīmitra is Gold refined from ore.

Manjushrimitra discusses the Mindstream (Sanskrit: citta-santana) in the Bodhicittabhavana, a seminal early text of Ati Yoga:  "The mental-continuum (citta-santana) is without boundaries or extension; it is not one thing, nor supported by anything."  In this work, Manjushrimistra counters and tempers the Madhyamaka of Nagarjuna into what developed into the Mindstream Doctrine.  Manjushrimitra makes it clear that intellectualism, philosophy and logic do not lead to realization and that "Those who seek the Truth must turn to direct yogic experience, should they hope to acquire realization."

Vajranatha (2007) contextualises Manjushrimitra and mentions Dzogchen, Chittamatra, Yogachara, Three Turnings of the Wheel of Dharma, and Garab Dorje:

See also
 Padmasambhava
 Vimalamitra

Notes

References
 

Dzogchen lamas
Nyingma lamas
Tibetan Buddhists from India
Year of birth missing
Year of death missing
Indian Buddhists